Archer Creek, a northern tributary of the Parramatta River, is a creek west of Sydney Harbour, located in Sydney, New South Wales, Australia. It joins the Parramatta River at Meadowbank Park, Meadowbank.

Ecology
The source of the creek is in the suburb of Eastwood.

The catchment is bounded by Hughes Avenue, Fitzgerald Road, Marsden Road, Brush Farm, Brush Road, Bellevue Avenue and Adelaide Street. The catchment straddles the boundary between Parramatta and Ryde councils. The catchment rises along the high ridgeline near Brush Farm Park and passes through a number of incised valleys until it reaches the flatter floodplain areas near the Parramatta River. The catchment is well developed. The upper areas are residential with extensive parklands along the creeklines. The flatter areas below Victoria Road contain several large industrial areas, as well as extensive parklands and the Ryde-Parramatta Golf Course.

History
Isaac Archer was granted  through which this watercourse runs. Isaac Archer was a private in Captain Campbell's company of marines and he received his grant of land from Governor Phillip in 1792.

See also
 Charity Creek, Meadowbank
 Smalls Creek, Meadowbank

References

Creeks and canals of Sydney